Chácara Klabin is an interchange station on Line 2 (Green) and Line 5 (Lilac) of the São Paulo Metro in the Vila Mariana district of São Paulo, Brazil.

Station layout

References

São Paulo Metro stations
Railway stations opened in 2006
2006 establishments in Brazil
Railway stations opened in 2018
2018 establishments in Brazil
Railway stations located underground in Brazil